Susanna and the Elders is a 1610 painting by the Italian Baroque artist Artemisia Gentileschi and is her earliest-known signed and dated work. It currently hangs in the Schloss Weißenstein collection, in Pommersfelden, Germany. The work shows an uncomfortable Susanna with the two men lurking above her while she is in the bath. This was a popular scene to paint during the time of the Baroque period. This subject matter for this painting comes from the deuterocanonical Book of Susanna in the Additions to Daniel. Susanna and the Elders was one of Gentileschi's signature works, with Gentileschi painting a variation of the scene a number of times at the beginning of her career.

Description

Subject matter

The painting is a representation of a biblical narrative featured in  chapter 13 of the Book of Daniel according to the text as maintained  by the Catholic and Eastern Orthodox churches, though not generally by  Protestants.

Two elderly men are shown spying on a young married woman named Susanna. Susanna had gone out to the garden one day for a bath when her housekeeper let the two elders in. The elders spied on Susanna and  then demanded sexual favors from her, which she refused. The men threatened to ruin her reputation, but Susanna held fast. The two elders then falsely accused Susanna of adultery - a crime which was punishable by death. It is only when a young Hebrew wise man named Daniel questioned them separately did he observe that details in the two elders' stories did not match up. Their conflicting stories revealed the falsehood of their testimony, thus clearing Susanna's name.

The subject was relatively common in European art from the 16th century, with Susanna exemplifying the virtues of modesty and fidelity. In practice however, it allowed artists the opportunity to display their skill in the depiction of the female nude, often for the pleasure of their male patrons.

Gentileschi's interpretation
Art historians Roberto Longhi and Andrea Emiliani questioned how Gentileschi could paint a convincing female nude at such a young age. They speculated whether she had studied female anatomy or used a model of her father's, as his work studio was in the family home. 

Gentileschi's painting has been compared to that of other artists who utilized the same subject. Gentileschi's  Susanna sits uncomfortably, a twist to her body showing her distress, unlike many depictions that fail to reveal any discomfort. A common comparison is made with Annibale Carracci’s version of Susanna and the Elders. Gentileschi's Susanna is both uncomfortable and more feminine than Carracci's Susanna, whose body appears more anatomically masculine yet is portrayed in a more eroticized position, as if receptive to the two elders' attention. Rather than depicting the typical body type of previous paintings of Susanna,  Gentileschi chose a more Classical style for Susanna's body, which elevates her nudity in a more heroic sense. The setting of this scene in a stone enclosure further represents a departure from the typical garden setting used in previous depictions by other artists. Gentileschi's vertical composition also spreads the two elders at the top as a dark element hovering over the scene, creating a feeling of malevolent pressure imposed upon Susanna.

Gentileschi painted this scene at least twice more during her lifetime. As this version is the earliest, it has been assumed by Roberto Contini, Germaine Greer, Susanna Stolzenwald, and Mary D. Garrard that she painted with  her father's guidance. However, no other artist had  explored the psychological dimension of this Biblical story before, suggesting that Gentileschi's father, a traditionally trained artist, would have had no hand in influencing the concept of the young artist's painting. Artemisia's naturalistic rendering of the female form stands in contrast to her father's style, however the adjustments revealed by x-rays may suggest that Orazio's guidance was focused on compositional arrangement rather than depiction.

Signature
Gentileschi's signature is shown on the stone step on the lower left of the image. She only signed 19 of her paintings in total. The spelling and format of signature varied because at that time, spelling was not standardized. Rather, the body of works are attributed to Gentileschi, partly because historians have been able to match her paintings‘ signatures on letters she wrote. However, Raymond Ward Bissell questioned if she was the one signing her paintings because of the spellings used in four of the letters in which "Gentileschi" is spelled with the letter "e" used in place of "i".

Gentileschi painting style
Gentileschi did not include landscape or background in many of her paintings. As shown in this painting, the only background is a blue sky. It was not until the mid-1630s that Gentileschi began using  background or landscape.

History

Date
The questioning of the date of the painting started in 1845, in Joseph Heller's guidebook for the Pommersfelden collection. Art historian Rave said that the last digit looked like a 6 or a 9, so the date could be 1616 or 1619. On the other hand, art historians such as Rose-Marie Hagen said that it was a zero, and the date of 1610 was correct. The painting was x-rayed in 1970 by Susanna P. Sack, which confirmed that the date is written as 1610. That revelation was published by Mary D. Garrard in 1982 and most scholars have accepted it. The date of the painting is important because a date of 1616 or 1619 it would put the painting into the Florentine period. However, since the work was completed in 1610, it was completed during the Roman period. Even Gentileschi's birth year was questioned by art historians Roberto Longhi and Andrea Emiliani, because there was an incorrect identification of her birth date. That was corrected by Bissell in 1968, after she found a public record of Gentileschi's birth year.

Father's guidance
Gentileschi's father, Orazio Gentileschi, was one of the first people in Italy to paint in the style of Caravaggio. With Gentileschi's father being her first teacher, it was not surprising that Gentileschi painted in a similar style. Art historians have different opinions about this version of Susanna and the Elders. One opinion comes from Marry D. Garrard who thinks that Gentileschi is representing a rare visual of a female who has been victimized. This is because Garrard believes that the painting could be related to Gentileschi's resistance to the sexual harassment that she received from men in her community before she was raped by Agostino Tassi. On the other hand, Gianni Papi stated that the two elders were meant to represent her father and her second teacher, Tassi, because it is thought that his harassment of her was going on in the years prior to the rape and trial. If she was being harassed by Tassi in years leading up to the trial, Gentileschi could have been portraying her feelings of the harassment in this painting. However, there is no evidence confirming either opinion.

Provenance
The painting was in the collection of the artist Benedetto Luti by 1715, as he made mention of it in a letter that year to his patron Hofrat Bauer von Heffenstein, who was a councilor to Lothar Franz von Schönborn, archbishop of Mainz. By 1719, the painting was part of the Schönborn collection. Joseph Heller's 1845 guidebook to the Schönborn collection at Pommersfelden included the first published attribution to Artemisia.

Impact
Artist Kathleen Gilje created a work of art based on Gentileschi's painting in which she made one, more violent version of Gentileschi's painting in lead paint, then painted a copy of Gentileschi's original over top. An x-ray of Gilje's painting shows Gentileschi's version of Susanna overlaying a version that depicts the rage and pain of a rape victim. Gilje titled this piece Susanna and the Elders Restored.

Notes

References 

 Christiansen, Keith; Mann, Judith, Orazio and Artemisia Gentileschi (Metropolitan Museum of Art 2001) pp. 296–299
 Garrard, Mary R, Artemisia Gentileschi Around 1622 The Shaping and Reshaping of an Artistic Identity (Regents of the University of California 2001) pp. 77–113
 Grace, Sherrill, Life without Instruction: Artemisia, and the Lesson of Perspective (University of British Columbia 2004) pp. 116–135 
 Locker, Jesse M., Artemisia Gentileschi: The Language of Painting (London 2015) pp. 48
 Mann, Judith W., Identity Signs: Meaning and Methods in Artemisia Gentileschi Signatures (Wiley) pp. 71–107 
 Slatkin, Wendy, Women Artists in History (Upper Saddle River 1997) pp. 73–75

1610 paintings
Paintings by Artemisia Gentileschi
Gentileschi